The Idea of the Good in Platonic-Aristotelian Philosophy is a 1978 book by the philosopher Hans-Georg Gadamer. P. Christopher Smith considers it among Gadamer's most important books, because it represents an extended example of Gadamerian hermeneutical techniques and provides new insights into Platonic-Aristotelian philosophy.

References

1978 non-fiction books
Works by Hans-Georg Gadamer
Ethics books
Yale University Press books